The Men competition at the 2019 World Aquatics Championships was held on 22 and 24 July 2019.

Results
The first two rounds were held on 22 July at 14:00.
The last two rounds were held on 24 July at 12:00.

References

Men